Marrubium vulgare (white horehound or common horehound) is a flowering plant in the mint family (Lamiaceae), native to Europe, northern Africa, and southwestern and central Asia. It is also widely naturalized in many places, including most of North and South America.

The flowers are white, borne in clusters on the upper part of the main stem.

Etymology
The Oxford English Dictionary derives the word horehound from Old English hoar ("white," "light-colored," as in "hoarfrost") and hune (a word of unknown origin designating a class of herbs or plants). The second element was altered by folk etymology.

Uses

Folk medicine

Horehound has been mentioned in conjunction with use as a folk medicine dating at least back to the 1st century BC, where it appeared as a remedy for respiratory ailments in the treatise De Medicina by Roman encyclopaedist Aulus Cornelius Celsus. The Roman agricultural writer Columella lists it as a remedy for expelling worms in farm animals in his important first-century work On Agriculture. Since then, horehound has appeared for similar purposes in numerous herbals over the centuries, such as The Herball, or, Generall historie of plantes by John Gerard, and Every Man His Own Doctor: or, The Poor Planter’s Physician by Dr. John Tennent.

M. vulgare has become a popular dietary supplement in the U.S. It has been described in the monographs of the German Commission_E as a treatment for colds, as a digestive, and as a choleretic. It is one of the ingredients of the Ricola throat lozenge. Its use as a therapy  has been under investigation for decades, and has been found in peer-reviewed publications to have antiinflammatory, analgesic, antispasmodic, and vasorelaxant properties. The U.S. Food and Drug Administration does not endorse the plant for use as a drug, but has declared it to be generally safe as a food additive.

Culinary

Horehound candy drops are bittersweet hard candies like cough drops made with sugar and an extract of M. vulgare. They are dark-colored, dissolve in the mouth, and have a flavor that has been compared to menthol and root beer. Like other products derived from M. vulgare, they are sometimes used as an unproven folk treatment for coughs and other ailments.

M. vulgare is used to make beverages such as horehound beer (similar to root beer), horehound herbal tea (similar to the Maghrebi mint tea), and the rock and rye cocktail.

As an invasive weed
Horehound was introduced to southern Australia in the 19th century as a medicinal herb.  It became a weed of native grasslands and pastures where it was introduced with settlers' livestock and was first declared under noxious weeds legislation. It now appears to have reached its full potential distribution.

In New Zealand, efforts are being made to control its spread with biocontrol measures using the horehound clearwing moth (Chamaesphecia mysiniformis) and the horehound plume moth (Wheeleria spilodactylus), which could eat their way through many plants.

Horehound is usually found in disturbed and overgrazed areas. It is highly unpalatable to livestock, so livestock eat other plants around it, a process that favors the persistence and spread of the weed. It may persist in native vegetation that has been grazed.

As biocontrol
Marrubium vulgare is also used as a natural grasshopper repellent in agriculture.

In astrology
Gower uses the older name, Alhaiot (VII:1338).

Gallery

See also
 List of candies

References

Further reading

Everist, D.L. (1981) Poisonous Plants of Australia. 3rd ed. (Angus & Robertson: Sydney). 
Parsons, W. & Cuthbertson, E. (2001) Noxious Weeds of Australia. 2nd ed. (CSIRO Publishing: Collingwood).

External links

Ecoport
Encyclopedia of Life
Flowers of India
India Biodiversity Portal
Jepson Manual Treatment
Trefle

vulgare
Flora of North Africa
Flora of Europe
Flora of Asia
Herbs
Medicinal plants
Plants described in 1753
Taxa named by Carl Linnaeus
Traditional medicine
Candy